Iliyan Ivanov Kiryakov (born 4 August 1967) is a Bulgarian former professional footballer who played as a right or left back.

During a professional career which spanned nearly 20 years, he played for nine different clubs, including three in Scotland.

Kiryakov won more than 50 caps for Bulgaria, and represented the nation at the 1994 World Cup and Euro 1996.

Club career
Kiryakov was born in the small town of Lesicheri. In his country, he represented Etar Veliko Tarnovo and PFC CSKA Sofia. In 1991, he moved abroad, signing with Deportivo de La Coruña. In his first season, he was first-choice (only missed three La Liga matches) but the Galicians barely avoided relegation, as 17th; subsequently, as Super Depor came to fruition, he became a fringe player and left.

Kiryakov continued in Spain for 1993–94, playing in the Segunda División with CP Mérida. He then returned to his country for one more year, with PFC CSKA Sofia, signing in the 1995 summer with Cyprus club Anorthosis Famagusta FC.

Kiryakov spent the following five years in Scotland, playing for Aberdeen (scoring once against Dundee United), Airdrieonians (only five months) and Raith Rovers. He finished his career in June 2003 at nearly 36: after a brief spell with lowly Akademik Svishtov, he retired at Etar, his first club.

A year later he returned to play for the amateur club Chumerna Elena. Same year he joined his birth city club CSKA Lesicheri in the regional divisions, then moved to other regional club Rositsa Polikraishte, before retiring again in Yantra 2002.

International career
During eight years, Kiryakov played 53 times for Bulgaria, scoring five goals.

He appeared in six matches in the 1994 FIFA World Cup (four complete) as the national side finished in fourth position, and was also picked for the squad at UEFA Euro 1996, where he played in the group stage 1–1 draw against Spain.

Honours
Etar Veliko Tarnovo
 A Group: 1990–91

Bulgaria
 FIFA World Cup fourth place: 1994

References

External links
 
 
 

1967 births
Living people
Bulgarian footballers
Association football defenders
First Professional Football League (Bulgaria) players
FC Etar Veliko Tarnovo players
FC Etar 1924 Veliko Tarnovo players
PFC CSKA Sofia players
La Liga players
Segunda División players
Deportivo de La Coruña players
CP Mérida footballers
Scottish Premier League players
Scottish Football League players
Aberdeen F.C. players
Airdrieonians F.C. (1878) players
Raith Rovers F.C. players
Cypriot First Division players
Anorthosis Famagusta F.C. players
PFC Akademik Svishtov players
Bulgaria youth international footballers
Bulgaria international footballers
1994 FIFA World Cup players
UEFA Euro 1996 players
Bulgarian expatriate footballers
Bulgarian expatriate sportspeople in Spain
Expatriate footballers in Spain
Bulgarian expatriate sportspeople in Cyprus
Expatriate footballers in Cyprus
Bulgarian expatriate sportspeople in Scotland
Expatriate footballers in Scotland